The 2016 World Club Series (also known as the 2016 Dacia World Club Series due to sponsorship by Dacia) was the second edition of the World Club Series and  saw three Super League teams and three National Rugby League (NRL) teams participate. The series included the World Club Challenge, a one-off match between the champions of the Super League and NRL.

Background
Qualification for the Super League teams was changed to include the Challenge Cup winners, as well as the League Leaders and Grand Final winner. As the Leeds Rhinos claimed all three possible qualification positions the Super League Board decided to invite Super League semi-finalist St Helens to take part in the series.

The three National Rugby League teams were announced as the champion North Queensland Cowboys, the Brisbane Broncos, who were defeated in the grand final, and the minor premier Sydney Roosters.

Series details

Game 1: Fourth Vs Minor Premiers
The match celebrated the 40th anniversary of the inaugural World Club Challenge, which involved both teams.

Game 2: Grand Final runners-up
Game 2 was a repeat of last years fixture where Brisbane Broncos won 14-12 in golden point extra time.

World Club Challenge
First time the two clubs had met since the 1997 World Club Championship tournament.

Leeds Rhinos

Leeds won the Treble in 2015 in their most successful season. They beat Wigan Warriors 22-20 in the Grand Final to qualify for their 7th World Club Challenge.

North Queensland Cowboys

The Cowboys won their first Premiership in 2015 which was their 20th anniversary. They beat the Brisbane Broncos in extra time of a dramatic Grand Final to qualify for their first World Club Challenge.

Teams

References

2016 in Australian rugby league
2016 in English rugby league
World Club Challenge
Leeds Rhinos matches
North Queensland Cowboys matches